Harry B. Amey (December 21, 1868 – December 6, 1949) was a Vermont attorney and public official.  He is notable for his service as state's attorney of Essex County, a member of the Vermont House of Representatives and Vermont Senate, and as United States Attorney for the District of Vermont from 1923 to 1932.

A native of Pittsburg, New Hampshire, Amey graduated from Dartmouth College in 1894, studied law with an attorney in Milton, New Hampshire, and attained admission to the bar in 1898.  He relocated to the Brighton, Vermont village of Island Pond in 1902, where he continued to practice law.  A Republican, he served as Essex County State's Attorney (1904–1908, 1910–1912), member of the Vermont House from Brighton (1910–1912), and member of the State Senate from Essex County (1919–1923).

In 1923, Amey was appointed Vermont's U.S. Attorney, and he served until 1933.  In 1934, he was an unsuccessful candidate for U.S. Senator, losing the Republican primary to incumbent Warren Austin.  He died in Island Pond on December 6, 1949 and was buried at Indian Stream Cemetery in Pittsburg, New Hampshire.

Early life
Harry Burton Amey was born in Pittsburg, New Hampshire on December 21, 1868, the son of John Tillotson and Emily (Haynes) Amey.  he attended the local schools and received his Bachelor of Arts degree from Dartmouth College in 1894.  He was a school teacher and principal while he studied law with an attorney in Milton, New Hampshire.  Amey attained admission to the bar in 1898, and began to practice in Milton.

Continued career
Amey moved to Island Pond, Vermont in 1902 and practiced law in partnership with Porter H. Dale.  The partnership proved a success, and Amey's clients included the Central Vermont Railway.  He became active in politics as a Republican, and served as state's attorney of Essex County from 1904 to 1908, and again from 1910 to 1912.

From 1910 to 1912, Amey represented the town of Brighton in the Vermont House of Representatives, succeeding Oscar T. Davis and being succeeded by Don Carlos Foss Jr.  In 1918 he was elected to represent Essex County in the Vermont Senate, succeeding George A. Hubbard.  He served 1919 to 1921, and was succeeded by Luther A. Cobb.

U.S. Attorney
In 1923, Amey was appointed United States Attorney for the District of Vermont, succeeding Vernon A. Bullard.  He served until 1933, and was succeeded by Joseph A. McNamara.

Later career
After resigning as U.S. Attorney, Amey continued to practice law in partnership with Porter Dale's son George.  In 1934, he made a quixotic run for U.S. Senator and was handily defeated in the Republican primary by incumbent Warren Austin.

Death and burial
Amey died in Island Pond on December 6, 1949.  He was buried in his family's plot at Indian Stream Cemetery in Pittsburg, New Hampshire.

Family
Amey's first wife was Grace (or Gracia) A. Norton (1876–1931), with whom he had two children, son Henry Tillotson Amey (1897–1975) and daughter Alpha Norton Amey (1899–1977), the wife of Benjamin Franklin Heath (1900–1973).  His second wife was Harriet May Hardy (1881–1968).

References

Sources

Newspapers.com

Books

Internet

External links

Harry B. Amey at The Political Graveyard

1868 births
1949 deaths
People from Coös County, New Hampshire
People from Brighton, Vermont
Dartmouth College alumni
New Hampshire lawyers
Vermont lawyers
State's attorneys in Vermont
Republican Party members of the Vermont House of Representatives
Republican Party Vermont state senators
United States Attorneys for the District of Vermont
Burials in New Hampshire